Harley Cokeliss (born  Harley Louis Cokliss, February 11, 1945) is an American director, writer and producer of film and television.

Early life 
Originally brought up in Chicago, he moved to Britain in 1966 to study at the London Film School, and spent the majority of his career in the UK.

Career 
Cokeliss started making documentaries for British television in 1970, including the first filmed version of J. G. Ballard's story Crash!. Papers relating to the film Crash! are available at the British Library (Add MS 89171/1). Cokeliss's initial treatment and Ballard's draft script for Crash! are published in Crash: The Collector's Edition, ed. Chris Beckett. He returned to Chicago in 1972 to make a documentary about blues musicians in the city.

Cokeliss later graduated to making feature films, serving as second unit director on The Empire Strikes Back before helming films like Battletruck, Black Moon Rising, and Malone. He wrote and directed the 1988 horror film Dream Demon. He has directed episodes of various television series, including The New Adventures of Robin Hood, CI5: The New Professionals, and Xena: Warrior Princess.

Filmography

Film 
Chicago Blues (1972) – producer and director
Six Reels of Film to Be Shown in Any Order (1971) – assistant director
The Battle of Billy's Pond (1976) – director and writer
The Glitterball (1977) – director and writer
That Summer! (1979) – director
The Empire Strikes Back (1980) – studio second unit director
Warlords of the 21st Century (1982) – director
Black Moon Rising (1986) – director
Malone (1987) – director
Dream Demon (1988) – director and writer
Pilgrim (2000) – director and writer
Paris Connections (2010) – director

Television 

 Crash! (1971) –  BBC short film based on J. G. Ballard's The Atrocity Exhibition
 Hercules: The Legendary Journeys (1994–95) – director; 3 episodes
Xena: Warrior Princess (1995) – director; 1 episode
The New Adventures of Robin Hood (1997) – director; 3 episodes
The Ruby Ring (1997) – director; television film
CI5: The New Professionals (1999) – director; 2 episodes
Dark Knight (2000) – director and writer; 2 episodes
The Immortal (2001) – director; 2 episodes
An Angel for May (2002) – director; television film

References

External links 
 
 
website: http://harleycokeliss.co.uk/

1945 births
Living people
Male actors from San Diego
American male film actors
Writers from San Diego
Film producers from California
Film directors from California
Alumni of the London Film School